King of Hearts was the first CD album for blues, soul singer King Ernest. He had been away from the music scene for some time and the album marked his return to music. It was also a blues award nominee.

Background
After retiring at 55, he recorded the album which was released on Evidence 26084 in 1997.
The album includes covers of "Black Bag Blues" which is a Lester Butler song and "Better Days" which was written by Mick Jagger and Jimmy Rip, which is an Otis Redding styled ballad. Charlie Musselwhite's "Long As I Have You" and Hound Dog Taylor's "Sadie" are also covered. Other compositions are by Ernest Baker, Andy Kaulkin and Randy Chortkoff. Lester Butler, Jimmy Rip, and East Hampton guitarist, Zach Zunis are among the musicians that played on the album.

In a review of the album, Nicky Baxter of Metroactive noted the ease that King Ernest had in going from blues to soul and back again. The only low point was some obtrusive piano pounding.

It was nominated in for a W. C. Handy Award in 1998. There were two categories. One was in Soul/Blues Album of the Year category and the other was in the Comeback Blues Album of the Year category.

Bakers follow-up album was in 2000 with Blues Got Soul.

Album details

References

1997 albums
King Ernest Baker albums
Evidence Music albums